Transcription factor Maf also known as proto-oncogene c-Maf or V-maf musculoaponeurotic fibrosarcoma oncogene homolog is a transcription factor that in humans is encoded by the MAF gene.

Types
One type, MafA, also known as RIPE3b1, promotes pancreatic development, as well as insulin gene transcription.

Interactions 

MAF has been shown to interact with:
 CREBBP 
 EP300
 MYB
 SOX9.

References

Further reading

External links 
 

Transcription factors